Bokermannohyla capra is a frog in the family Hylidae.  It is endemic to the Atlantic forests in Bahia, Brazil.

Description

References

Hylidae
Species described in 2009
Amphibians of Brazil